Scott Cody McAfee (born September 29, 1981) is an American actor best known as the voice of Littlefoot from The Land Before Time films II-IV. He is the younger brother of Anndi McAfee, who is the current voice for The Land Before Time character Cera.

Filmography

Television
Avatar: The Last Airbender (2005)
Boston Public (2000)
Freaks and Geeks (2000)
Batman Beyond: The Movie (1999) (voice)
Batman Beyond (1999) (voice)
Animaniacs  (1995) (voice)
Freakazoid! (1995) (voice)
Bump in the Night (1995) (voice)
Batman: The Animated Series (1994) (voice)
Lois & Clark: The New Adventures of Superman (1993) (voice)
Home Free (1993)
Her Final Fury: Betty Broderick, the Last Chapter (1992)
Hardball (1989)
Jim Henson Presents Mother Goose Stories (1987)

Film
 Howl's Moving Castle (2004)
The Oz Kids Christmas in Oz (1996) - Scarecrow Jr. (singing voice)
The Oz Kids Virtual Oz (1996) - Scarecrow, Jr. (voice)
The Oz Kids The Monkey Prince (1996) - Scarecrow, Jr. (voice)
The Oz Kids Journey Beneath the Sea (1997) - Scarecrow, Jr. (voice)
The Oz Kids Return of Mombi (1997) - Scarecrow, Jr. (voice)
The Oz Kids (1996) - Scarecrow, Jr. (voice)
The Land Before Time II: The Great Valley Adventure (1994) - Littlefoot (voice)
The Land Before Time III: The Time of the Great Giving (1995) - Littlefoot (voice)
Toy Story (1995) - Kid (voice)
The Land Before Time IV: Journey Through the Mists (1996) - Littlefoot (voice)
Midnight Run (1988) - Boy on Plane

Recognition
In 1994, he was nominated for a Young Artist Award for "Best Youth Actor in a Voiceover Role - TV or Movie" for his work in "Batman: The Animated Series" and "Best Youth Actor Leading Role in a Television Series" for his 1993 work in "Home Free."

References

External links

American male child actors
American male film actors
American male television actors
Living people
Place of birth missing (living people)
1981 births
American male voice actors